The Australian National Business Schools are a consortium of Six Australian Business schools that include:

 University of Western Australia
 University of Wollongong
 University of Tasmania
 Griffith University
 Deakin University
 University of Canberra

Higher education in Australia